Yekaterina Kondratyeva (born 8 April 1982) is a Russian sprinter who specializes in the 200 metres.

She holds the current world indoor record in the rarely contested 4 x 200 metres relay (1:32.41 with Yuliya Pechonkina, Irina Khabarova and Yuliya Gushchina).

Competition record

Personal bests
100 metres - 11.40 s (2004)
200 metres - 22.64 s (2004)

References

External links 

1982 births
Living people
Russian female sprinters
Athletes (track and field) at the 2004 Summer Olympics
Olympic athletes of Russia
World Athletics indoor record holders (relay)
World Athletics Championships athletes for Russia
Universiade medalists in athletics (track and field)
Universiade gold medalists for Russia
Universiade silver medalists for Russia
Competitors at the 2007 Summer Universiade
Medalists at the 2003 Summer Universiade
Olympic female sprinters